Nola subchlamydula is a moth of the family Nolidae. It is found in North Africa and Southern and South-Eastern Europe.

The wingspan is 17–19 mm.

The larvae feed on Teucrium chamaedrys, Salvia and Lavandula stoechas.

References

External links
Species info

subchlamydula
Moths of Europe
Moths of Asia
Moths described in 1871